This list of Volkswagen Group engines includes internal combustion engines and related technologies produced by the German automotive concern, Volkswagen Group.

Lists of all engines
The following articles list Volkswagen Group engines which are available worldwide.  These include motor vehicle engines, marine engines sold by Volkswagen Marine and industrial engines sold by Volkswagen Industrial Motor.
List of Volkswagen Group petrol engines (current)
List of Volkswagen Group diesel engines (current)
List of discontinued Volkswagen Group petrol engines
List of discontinued Volkswagen Group diesel engines

Specific engines, engine series, regional engines
Volkswagen air-cooled engine
Wasserboxer
Volkswagen EA827 engine
Volkswagen D24 engine
Volkswagen D24T engine
Volkswagen D24TIC engine
G60
VR6 engine
List of North American Volkswagen engines

Technologies
Some of the technologies which are unique to Volkswagen Group include:
G-Lader
Turbocharged Direct Injection
Suction Diesel Injection
Pumpe Düse
Digifant Engine Management system
Fuel Stratified Injection
BlueMotion
Cylinder On Demand

References

loda lsuun engine

External links
VolkswagenAG.com - Volkswagen Group corporate website

 
Lists of automobile engines